Downburst is the seventh studio album by the German metal band Brainstorm, released on 25 January 2008. Former bassist Andreas Mailänder left the band before recordings started, so bass was handled by Torsten and Milan on this album.

Track listing 
All songs written and arranged by Brainstorm.

 "Falling Spiral Down" – 4:34 
 "Fire Walk with Me" – 4:24  
 "Stained with Sin" – 3:38
 "Redemption in Your Eyes" – 4:26 
 "End in Sorrow" – 4:48 
 "How Do You Feel" – 3:49 
 "Protect Me from Myself" – 4:42  
 "Surrounding Walls" – 4:10
 "Frozen" – 4:37  
 "All Alone" – 4:14

The European limited edition of the album also includes

 "Crawling in Chains"  - 3:47 
 "Hold Tight"  - 4:06

The Japanese edition has three bonus tracks

 "Crawling in Chains" - 3:44
 "Drowning" - 4:32
 "Fire Walk with Me (Firestarter Mix)" - 4:46

Personnel
Band members
 Andy B. Franck - lead and backing vocals  
 Torsten Ihlenfeld - guitars, bass, backing vocals  
 Milan Loncaric - guitars, bass, backing vocals    
 Dieter Bernert - drums

Additional musicians
Michael 'Miro' Rodenberg - keyboards, producer, engineer, mastering

Production
Sascha Paeth - producer, engineer, mixing
Simon Oberender, Olaf Reitmeier - engineers

References

2008 albums
Brainstorm (German band) albums
Metal Blade Records albums